Pitt Academy is located in Louisville, Kentucky, United States. It was founded in 1949 by Monsignor Felix Newton Pitt, for special needs children. The school participates in the Special Olympics.

There is a yearly barbecue in May of each year. The cooking team of Saint Pius X of Owensboro, Kentucky comes to help.

See also
 List of schools in Louisville

References

External links
 www.pitt.com - official Pitt Academy website

Roman Catholic schools in Louisville, Kentucky
Catholic elementary schools in Kentucky
Catholic secondary schools in Kentucky
Educational institutions established in 1949
1949 establishments in Kentucky